Kaali is a group of nine meteorite craters in the village of Kaali on the Estonian island of Saaremaa. Most recent estimates put its formation shortly after 1530–1450 BC (3237+/-10 14C yr BP). It was created by an impact event and is one of the few impact events that has occurred in a populated area (other ones are: Henbury craters and Carancas crater).

Before the 1930s there were several hypotheses about the origin of the crater, including theories involving vulcanism and karst processes. Its meteoritic origins were first conclusively demonstrated by Ivan Reinvald in 1928, 1933 and 1937.

Formation

The impact is thought to have happened in the Holocene period, around 3,500 years ago. The estimates of the age of the Kaali impact structure (Saaremaa Island, Estonia) provided by different authors vary by as much as 6,000 years, ranging from ~6,400 to ~400 years before current era (BCE). Analysis of silicate spherules in Estonian bogs show that the possible age of the impact craters could be approximately 7,600 years. A study based on elevated iridium signal in a nearby bog suggested the much younger age of 4th century BC. According to some researchers the meteor arrived from the north-east.

Kaali Lake is on the bottom of this crater. Eight smaller craters are also associated with this bombardment. They are all within  of the main crater.

Effects
According to the theory of more recent impact, Estonia at the time of impact was in the Nordic Bronze Age and the site was forested with a small human population. The impact energy of about 80 TJ (20 kilotons of TNT) is comparable with that of the Hiroshima bomb blast. It incinerated forests within a  radius.

In mythology

Scholars, such as Karl Kello, maintain that the event figured prominently in regional mythology. It was, and still is, considered a sacred lake. There is archaeological evidence that it may well have been a place of ritual sacrifice.

Finnish mythology has stories that may originate with the formation of Kaali. One of them is in runes 47, 48 and 49 of the Kalevala epic: Louhi, the evil wizard, steals the Sun and fire from people, causing total darkness. Ukko, the god of the sky, orders a new Sun to be made from a spark. The virgin of the air starts to make a new Sun, but the spark drops from the sky and hits the ground. This spark goes to an "Aluen" or "Kalevan" lake and causes its water to rise. Finnish heroes see the ball of fire falling somewhere "behind the Neva river" (the direction of Estonia from Karelia). The heroes head in that direction to seek fire, and they finally gather flames from a forest fire.

According to a theory first proposed by Lennart Meri, it is possible that Saaremaa was the legendary Thule island, first mentioned by ancient Greek geographer Pytheas, whereas the name "Thule" could have been connected to the Finnic word tule ("(of) fire") and the folklore of Estonia, which depicts the birth of the crater lake in Kaali. Kaali was considered the place where "The sun went to rest."

Namesake
The asteroid 4227 Kaali is named after it (except for their names, there is no connection between this asteroid and the crater).

References

External links

About Kaali crater on the official Saaremaa website
Photos of the Kaali crater
Impact tectonics
Interactive panoramic aerial view of the Kaali crater area

Impact craters of Estonia
Holocene impact craters
Lakes of Estonia
Saaremaa Parish
Sacred lakes
Saaremaa
Landforms of Saare County
Tourist attractions in Saare County
Impact crater lakes